Wakaf Che Yeh is a suburb in Kelantan, Malaysia, in the southern part of Kota Bharu's metropolitan area. It is located about 7 kilometres from downtown Kota Bharu along the Kuala Krai Highway Federal Route 8.

The town is famous for its daily and weekly market. Wakaf Che Yeh has been progressing well for the last ten years. A small supermarket can also be found at the area. RTM's Kelantan representative office is in the suburb.

References

Towns in Kelantan